The Four Musketeers is a musical with a score by Laurie Johnson and lyrics by Herbert Kretzmer. It was developed from a book by Michael Pertwee loosely based on The Three Musketeers.

The musical premiered at the Theatre Royal, Drury Lane, London on 5 December 1967.  It was directed by Peter Coe. The sets were designed by Sean Kenny.

Harry Secombe played D'Artagnan, with Aubrey Woods as Richelieu. Also in the original London cast were: Elizabeth Larner, Glyn Owen, John Junkin, Stephanie Voss, Jeremy Lloyd, Sheena Marshe and Kenneth Connor.

The show ran for 462 performances.

References
Tanvitch, Robert.  The London Stage in the 20th Century Haus Publishing Ltd  

1967 musicals
West End musicals
Musicals based on novels
British musicals
Musicals based on works by Alexandre Dumas
Works based on The Three Musketeers